John William Michael Bliss  (1941–2017) was a Canadian historian and author. Though his early works focused on business and political history, he subsequently authored several important medical biographies, including of Sir William Osler. Bliss was also a frequent commentator on political events and issues. He was an Officer of the Order of Canada.

Early life
Born on January 18, 1941, in Leamington, Ontario, Bliss was raised in nearby Kingsville, Ontario. His father, Quartus Bliss, was a Kingsville-based physician who encouraged Michael to enter the medical field. In an autobiographical essay, Bliss explained that his aspirations were shattered when watching his father suture a drunk's face:

Academic pursuits
Bliss entered the University of Toronto in 1958, and received his Bachelor of Arts, Master of Arts, and Doctor of Philosophy degrees there. He was appointed to the faculty in 1968 and by the time of his retirement in 2006 had attained the elite rank of University Professor.

His doctoral dissertation, which was supervised by Ramsay Cook, was a social history of Canadian business, an analysis of the "thoughts and dreams" of businessmen in Canada during the National Policy years. It was published under the title A Living Profit. In 1978 he published a major biography of Sir Joseph Flavelle, "A Canadian Millionaire", and in 1987 the first history of business in Canada, "Northern Enterprise".

In 1982, he began a mid-career transition to medical history with his book "The Discovery of Insulin". He has published biographies of two Canadians, the discoverer of insulin Sir Frederick Banting and the famous physician Sir William Osler. In 2005, he published a biography of the American neurosurgeon Harvey Cushing, himself also a biographer of Osler.

Like J. L. Granatstein, his criticism of excessively specialized social history has made him a controversial figure in Canadian historiography.

Bliss has been a frequent commentator on Canadian politics for newspapers, magazines, and television, and has lectured widely in North America and Europe.

In a 2005 profile for the National Post, former student John Turley-Ewart writes: "In the 1990s, when I worked as his teaching assistant, it was not unusual to see 300 people from all walks of life – full-time students, business people, civil servants, journalists – packed into his evening lectures." He was nominated by Turley-Ewart as Canada's "leading public intellectual", part of a series that ran in National Post.

Awards and distinctions
In 1998, he was made a Member of the Order of Canada and was promoted to Officer in 2013. His books have won various prizes, including the Welch Medal of the American Association for the History of Medicine, the Tyrrell Medal of the Royal Society of Canada, three Jason Hannah Medals of the Royal Society of Canada, the Garneau, Macdonald, and Ferguson prizes of the Canadian Historical Association, and the National Business Book Award. His book on Osler was shorted for the Governor General's Award. He was an honorary member of the Harvey Club of London, the oldest medical club in Canada, for his historical biographical contributions on Banting, another honorary member of the Harvey Club.  He is an honorary fellow of the Royal College of Physicians and Surgeons of Canada and holds honorary degrees from the University of Prince Edward Island, McMaster University, McGill, the University of British Columbia, and the University of Toronto. In 2008 his students published a festschrift, "Essays in Honour of Michael Bliss: Figuring the Social". In 2016 he became the first historian inducted into the Canadian Medical Hall of Fame.

In 2011, he received the Lifetime Achievement Award from the American Osler Society in 2010

Political commentary
Bliss frequently commented on current events, contributing essays to various magazine and newspapers, including The Globe and Mail. He opposed the Meech Lake Accord and the Charlottetown Accord and the 1999 NATO bombing of Kosovo and he advocated for the abolition of the Canadian monarchy. He also strongly criticized Stephen Harper's 2006 move to recognize the Québécois as a nation.

Death
Michael Bliss died on May 18, 2017, in Toronto, Ontario, at the age of 76.

Works
A Living Profit: studies in the social history of Canadian business 1883-1911 - 1974.
Confederation, 1867: The Creation of the Dominion of Canada - 1975
A Canadian Millionaire: The Life and Business Times for Sir Joseph Flavelle - 1978
The Discovery of Insulin - 1982
Frederick Banting: A Biography - 1984
Northern Enterprise: Five Centuries of Canadian Business - 1987
Plague: A Story of Smallpox in Montreal - 1991 (nominated for Governor General's Award)

William Osler: a Life in Medicine - 1999 (nominated for Governor General's Award)
Harvey Cushing: a Life in Surgery - 2005
The Making of Modern Medicine: Turning Points in the Treatment of Disease - 2010
Writing History: A Professor's Life - 2011 (a first-person memoir)

References

Sources 
 E.A. Heaman, Alison Li, and Shelley McKellar (2008) Essays in Honour of Michael Bliss: Figuring the Social, University of Toronto Press
 
 
 
 Bliss, Michael (2011) Writing History: A Professor's Life, Dundurn

External links
Michael Bliss entry in Canadian Who's Who
Video History of Medicine in Canada Project: The Friends of CIHR

1941 births
2017 deaths
Historians of Canada
Canadian male non-fiction writers
Canadian biographers
Male biographers
Canadian medical historians
Fellows of the Royal Society of Canada
Officers of the Order of Canada
Writers from Toronto
University of Toronto alumni
People from Leamington, Ontario